A list of animated feature films first released in 1984.

See also
 List of animated television series of 1984

References

 Feature films
1984
1984-related lists